Martin Dow is a Pakistani multinational pharmaceutical company which is based in Karachi, Pakistan. It was founded in 1995 and is one of the leading pharmaceutical companies in Pakistan. It has more than 60 brands and over 1000 employees. Its products are manufactured in Karachi at its cGMP compliant manufacturing plant.

As of 2016, Martin Dow had six manufacturing facilities in Pakistan and one in France.

History 
The company was founded in 1995.

In 2010, Martin Dow acquired the manufacturing facility and brands of Roche Pakistan. 

In 2015, Martin Dow was recognized as a Global Growth Company by the World Economic Forum. In the same year, Martin Dow entered into an alliance with Biocodex S.A., a France-based pharmaceutical company.

In 2016, German Merck KGaA executed a binding contract to divest its shareholding in Pakistan to Martin Dow Ltd. 

In 2016, in a €1.5 million deal, Martin Dow acquired the Bristol-Myers Squibb's pharmaceutical manufacturing facility in Meymac, France. In March 2017, the French President Francois Hollande inaugurated Martin Dow Pharma's Meymac Plant in France. The plant of V2Pharm in Gien, France, was also taken over by Martin Dow.

In 2020, Martin Dow was awarded for excellent performance in fire safety and protection by the Sindh Local Government minister.

Scientific Research 
In 2021, Martin Dow launched its scientific training sessions in 6 cities of Pakistan with the name of MDFIRST (Martin Dow Fellows in Research and Training). It focused on training medical post-graduate trainees on medical research writing, methodology, biostatistics and article publication skills. The aim of the program was to enhance the quality of researches generated from medical community and to equip medical professionals with knowledge that enables them to publish their quality work in national and international medical journals.

Controversy 	
In 2016, the National Accountability Bureau (NAB) arrested two directors of Martin Dow because it wrongfully derived financial benefits on the basis of illegal price increase.

References

Pharmaceutical companies of Pakistan
Manufacturing companies based in Karachi
Pharmaceutical companies established in 1995
Pakistani companies established in 1995
Pakistani brands
Multinational companies headquartered in Pakistan
Privately held companies of Pakistan